"No Matter What" is a song recorded by British singer-songwriter Calum Scott for the special edition of his debut studio album, Only Human. It was released on 19 October 2018 as the album's fifth overall single and the first single from the special edition.

Background
Scott describes "No Matter What" as his "most personal song" and the song he is "most proud of". The song tells the story of Scott telling his parents he was gay and their reactions of loving him "no matter what". Scott said "It was a song that I always had to write, and a song I never thought I'd be able to share. This song has so much bones behind it and has such a wider discussion, not only about sexuality but about acceptance." adding "This hopefully will be a movement. I want to help people, I want to inspire people, I want to make people more compassionate."

Music video
The music video was released on 8 November 2018 on Scott's YouTube channel via Vevo. It was directed by Ozzie Pullin.

Critical reception
Katrina Rees from CelebMix called the song "a stunning piano ballad" with lyrics that are "raw and extremely personal".

Track listing

Charts

Release history

References

External links
 

2018 songs
2018 singles
Calum Scott songs
Capitol Records singles
LGBT-related songs
Songs written by Toby Gad
Songs written by Calum Scott